is a building complex located in East Ikebukuro, Toshima, Tokyo, Japan.  It has the 240-metre tall Sunshine 60 skyscraper at its centre.  Sunshine City consists of four buildings: Sunshine 60, the main and tallest building, which includes corporate offices as well as restaurants; the Prince Hotel; the World Import Mart; and the Bunka Kaikan building.  The complex sits on land that was once occupied by Sugamo Prison.

The lower floors of the complex cater toward passerby and customers with a large shopping mall and numerous restaurants, while the higher floors tend to include corporate offices and hotel rooms.  The complex, which was opened in 1978, contains numerous attractions including an observatory (observation deck) located at the top of Sunshine 60 called Sky Circus, the Ancient Orient Museum, an aquarium, a planetarium, the Prince Hotel, a Namco-run indoor amusement park, a convention centre, and a theatre.

When it was opened, Sunshine 60 office tower block was reputed to be the tallest building in Asia.  It is an early example of a "city within a city", a self-contained area with places to live, work, and shop all within one area.

Since Sunshine 60's Sky Circus observatory was opened, other observation decks have opened in Tokyo, such as at Roppongi and the Tokyo Government offices.

Attractions

Sunshine Aquarium

Sunshine Aquarium is an aquarium located on the top three floors and rooftop of the World Import Mart building in Sunshine City.  It features around 80 tanks with 37,000 fish representing 750 species.  The Aquarium was renovated and updated in 2011.

Ancient Orient Museum

The  is a small private museum in Sunshine City at the 7th floor of the Cultural Center (文化会館), specializing in artifacts of the ancient Near East and Central Asia. It has a collection of Greco-Buddhist art of Gandhara, and several pieces pertaining to the art of Palmyra and Persia.

Namco Namja Town

Namco Namja Town (ナムコナンジャータウン lit. Namuko Nanjā Taun) is an indoor theme park in the second floor of the Sunshine City shopping complex. The park was opened in 1996 by Namco, a Japanese company best known for producing video games, although the park itself does not completely focus on those games. Instead, it features themed dining, carnival-style games, a haunted house, and a line of character mascots exclusive to the park.  Various promotions related to video games exist as well, often on a rotating basis.  Namco developed two games based on the park; the first of which, Nakavu no Daiboken: My Favorite Namja Town, was released in 2000 for the PlayStation in Japan only, while a second game, simply titled Namja Town, was released for iOS in the early 2010s.

Namco also ran J-World Tokyo, a manga-themed park which opened in 2013 on the third floor immediately above Namja Town. J-World Tokyo closed on February 17, 2019 due to poor attendance.

See also
 List of museums in Tokyo

References

External links
  
 Japan-Guide: Ikebukuro
  Namja Town website
  Namja Town Guidemap PDF
 Ancient Orient Museum (English)

Ikebukuro
Buildings and structures in Toshima
Tourist attractions in Tokyo
Mitsubishi Estate
1996 establishments in Japan